Theodore E. "Ty" Disney (April 13, 1908 – November 10, 1962) was an American football player and coach. He served as the head football coach at Tusculum College in Greeneville, Tennessee in 1937. He also served as the school's men's basketball coach during the 1937–38 season.

Head coaching record

College football

References

1908 births
1962 deaths
American football halfbacks
Tennessee Volunteers football players
Tusculum Pioneers football coaches
Tusculum Pioneers men's basketball coaches
High school football coaches in Kentucky
High school football coaches in Tennessee